Claudio Martín Cabrera (born 20 November 1963) is an Argentine football coach and former player who played as a midfielder. He is the current manager of Huracán's reserve side.

Playing career
A River Plate youth graduate, Cabrera impressed during his spell at Huracán, and subsequently represented Vélez Sarsfield, Argentinos Juniors and Boca Juniors before being marred by knee injuries. He subsequently played for Almagro and retired with Arsenal de Sarandí.

At international level, Cabrera competed in the men's tournament at the 1988 Summer Olympics, and also played five times for the Argentina national team between 1988 and 1989.

Coaching career
In January 2022, Cabrera became a manager of Huracán's reserve side. On 16 May of that year, he became an interim manager of the first team after Frank Darío Kudelka resigned.

References

External links

1963 births
Living people
Argentine footballers
Argentina international footballers
Olympic footballers of Argentina
Footballers at the 1988 Summer Olympics
Footballers from Buenos Aires
Association football midfielders
Club Atlético River Plate footballers
Club Atlético Huracán footballers
Club Atlético Vélez Sarsfield footballers
Argentinos Juniors footballers
Boca Juniors footballers
Club Almagro players
Arsenal de Sarandí footballers
Argentine football managers
Club Atlético Huracán managers